Yellowstone Public Radio is a public radio regional network based in Billings, Montana with transmitters covering most of Montana, as well as northern Wyoming and eastern Idaho.  It is operated by Montana State University Billings.  It airs a mix of programming from National Public Radio, classical music and jazz.

History
The network's first station, KEMC in Billings, signed on in 1972 as a 10-watt station owned by what was then Eastern Montana College.  It boosted its power to 24,500 watts in 1978. It gradually transitioned from a college radio station to a more professional operation. This culminated in 1984, when it hired a professional station manager and joined National Public Radio, becoming the state's second NPR member. Over the next decade, it boosted its signal to 100,000 watts, and built a network of translators and repeaters across Montana, and now has one of the largest geographical coverage areas in the entire NPR system.  Shortly after EMC merged with the Montana State University System, KEMC rebranded itself Yellowstone Public Radio, reflecting that its coverage area spanned across most of the area around Yellowstone National Park.  In the same year, its home since 1983, a three-story house west of campus, was renamed the Joseph L. Sample Studios in honor of the Montana broadcasting pioneer.

Stations and translators
Yellowstone Public Radio is broadcast by twelve full-power stations. The network is also relayed by an additional 28 translators to widen its broadcast area.

Notes:

References

External links
 Yellowstone Public Radio

 

Billings metropolitan area
Montana State University Billings
NPR member networks
1972 establishments in Montana
American radio networks
Radio broadcasting companies of the United States